Murchisonellidae is a taxonomic family of sea snails, marine opisthobranch gastropod mollusks in the superfamily Murchisonelloidea.

Taxonomy

1999 taxonomy 
Under the system according to Christoffer Schander, Van Aartsen & Corgan (1999), there were five genera in the Ebalidae:

 Ebala J. E. Gray, 1847
 Bermudaclis Bartsch, 1947
 Chesapeakella Campbell, 1993
 Ebalina Thiele, 1929
 Henrya Bartsch, 1947

2005 taxonomy 
This family has no subfamilies (according to the taxonomy of the Gastropoda by Bouchet & Rocroi, 2005).

This has been changed in 2013 into two subfamilies.

Genera
Genera within the family Muchisonellidae include:
Subfamily Ebalinae Warén, 1995
 Ebala Gray, 1847 - synonym: Anisocycla Monterosato, 1880
Subfamily Murchisonellinae T. L. Casey, 1904
 Henrya Bartsch, 1947
 Koloonella Laseron, 1959
 Murchisonella Mörch, 1875 - type genus
 Pseudoaclisina Yoo, 1994
Genera brought into synonymy 
 Bermudaclis Bartsch, 1947: synonym of Murchisonella Mörch, 1875
 Laseronella Whitley, 1959: synonym of Murchisonella Mörch, 1875
 Murchisoniella P. Fischer, 1885: synonym of Murchisonella Mörch, 1875
 Pandorella Laseron, 1951: synonym of Murchisonella Mörch, 1875

References 

 Peñas, A.; Rolán, E. (2013). Revision of the genera Murchisonella and Pseudoaclisina (Gastropoda, Heterobranchia, Murchisonellidae). Vita Malacologica. 11: 15-64
 Warén A. (2013) Murchisonellidae: who are they, where are they and what are they doing? (Gastropoda, lowermost Heterobranchia). Vita Malacologica 11: 1-14

 
Taxa named by Thomas Lincoln Casey Jr.